Domenico Manetti (1609–1663) was at Italian painter.

Manetti was born at Siena in 1609, and was probably a relation of Rutilio Manetti. He painted chiefly for the churches of Siena, but also produced historical subjects of an easel size. Lanzi particularly mentions one in the Casa Magnoni, representing the Baptism of Constantine. He died in 1663.

References

External links

1609 births
1663 deaths
Italian Baroque painters
17th-century Italian painters
Italian male painters
Painters from Siena
History painters